The Atlantic Ocean Road or the Atlantic Road is an  long section of County Road 64 that runs through an archipelago in Hustadvika and Averøy municipalities in Møre og Romsdal county, Norway. It passes by Hustadvika, an unsheltered part of the Norwegian Sea, connecting  the island of Averøy with the mainland and Romsdalshalvøya peninsula. It runs between the villages of Kårvåg in Averøy and Vevang in Hustadvika. It is built on several small islands and skerries, which are connected by several causeways, viaducts and eight bridges—the most prominent being Storseisundet Bridge.

The route was originally proposed as a railway line in the early 20th century, but this was abandoned. Serious planning of the road started in the 1970s, and construction started on August 1st 1983. During construction the area was hit by 12 European windstorms. The road was opened on 7 July 1989, having cost 122 million Norwegian krone (NOK), of which 25 percent was financed with tolls and the rest from public grants. Collection of tolls was scheduled to run for 15 years, but by June 1999 the road was paid off and the toll removed. The road is preserved as a cultural heritage site and is classified as a National Tourist Route. It is a popular site to film automotive commercials, has been declared the world's best road trip, and been awarded the title as "Norwegian Construction of the Century". In 2009, the Atlantic Ocean Tunnel opened from Averøy to Kristiansund; together they form a second fixed link between Kristiansund and Molde.

Route description
The road runs across an archipelago of partially inhabited islands and skerries. To the north lies Hustadvika, an unsheltered section of the Norwegian Sea, to the south Lauvøyfjorden. It consists of eight bridges and four resting places and viewpoints. Several tourist sites, including dining, fishing and scuba diving resorts, have been established on the islands. Along with the section from Vevang to Bud, the road has been designated one of 18 National Tourist Routes.

The road begins at Utheim on Averøy, close to the village of Kårvåg. Next it crosses the equally long Geitøysund Bridge to Geitøya, which features a viewpoint and parking. It then runs across Eldhusøya and Lyngholmen, before reaching Ildhusøya, where there are a resting place, parking and a viewpoint. The municipal boundary between Eide and Averøy runs under the bridge. From there the road runs through Skarvøy and Strømsholmen, both with a resting place.

History

The first proposals to use the route were made in the early 20th century. Planning of the Rauma Line to connect the national railway network to Møre og Romsdal was under way, and several proposals were made to extend it to the coastal towns. In 1921, Møre og Romsdal County Council chose the outer route, which would have followed a path close to that of the road. The Rauma Line was not built beyond Åndalsnes, and in 1935 the Parliament of Norway decided to connect the coastal towns in Møre og Romsdal to Åndalsnes by road instead of rail.

Although the plans were officially shelved, locals continued to work with the idea of a road connecting Averøy with the mainland. The toll company Atlanterhavsveien AS was established in 1970. Arne Rettedal, who was Minister of Local Government and Regional Development in the early 1980s, proposed that job creation funds could be allocated to road projects. The proposal was approved in 1983, after it had been supported by the municipalities of Averøy, Eide and Fræna. Construction started as a municipal road project on 1 August 1983, but progressed slowly. From 1 July 1986, the Norwegian Public Roads Administration took over the project, speeding up construction and allowing it to open on 7 July 1989. During construction, the area was hit by 12 hurricanes. The opening of the road allowed the Tøvik–Ørjavik Ferry to be terminated.

Construction cost NOK 122 million and was financed 25 percent by debt to be recollected through tolls, 25 percent by job creation funds and 50 percent by ordinary state road grants. There was significant local opposition against toll financing, as few people believed it would be possible to pay off the road in the stipulated 15 years. However, by June 1999 the road was paid off and  tolls removed. The accelerated amortization was caused both by greater than predicted local traffic and by large amounts of tourist traffic.

In 2009, the road was Norway's ninth-most-visited natural tourist attraction, with 258,654 visitors from May through August. The route won the title "Norwegian Construction of the Century", awarded by the Norwegian construction industry in 2005. In 2006, The Guardian declared it the world's best road trip. The road has become a popular place for the automotive industry to film advertisements; more than ten manufacturers have made television commercials along the route, often depicting the harsh weather. The Norwegian Directorate for Cultural Heritage preserved the road as a cultural heritage in December 2009. The Atlantic Ocean Tunnel between Averøy and Kristiansund opened on 19 December 2009. In combination with the road it provides a fixed link between Kristiansund and Molde. This is the second fixed link between the two towns, after the 1992 opening of the Kristiansund and Frei Fixed Link.

Junctions

The following is a list of bridges and major road junctions along the road. For bridges, it lists the name, overall length and clearance below; for junctions, the distance from the starting point and the name of the road it intersects with.

References

Works cited

External links

Google Earth view

Bridges in Møre og Romsdal
Roads in Møre og Romsdal
Former toll roads in Norway
Hustadvika (municipality)
Averøy
Norwegian County Road 64
1989 establishments in Norway
National Tourist Routes in Norway